Saín Alto is a municipality in the Mexican state of Zacatecas, located approximately  northwest of the state capital of Zacatecas City.

Geography
It borders the municipalities of Río Grande to the north, Fresnillo to the south, and Sombrerete to the west.

As of 2009, the land cover in Saín Alto comprises grassland (51%), forest (23%), and matorral (6%). Another 19% of the land is used for agriculture. The municipality lies in the endorheic basin of the Aguanaval River, which flows south to north through the eastern part of the municipality. A portion of the Sierra Madre Occidental known as the Sierra de Chapultepec runs through the southwestern part of the municipality. The range contains small deposits of mercury and tin, which were exploited between the 1940s and 1970s.

Apart from the mountains in the south where the climate is classified as temperate, Saín Alto has a semi-arid climate with dry winters.

History
These people were led by a cacique named Saín Alonso. The town's full name was originally "San Sebastián con el renombre de Saín", but it eventually became known as San Sebastián de Saín Alto and later just Saín Alto.

The first Zacatecas state constitution of 1825 named Saín Alto as a municipality within the partido of Sombrerete, later the district of Sombrerete. Saín Alto became a free municipality on 19 August 1916. Mercury mining began in the municipality in 1934, and accounted for 12% of Mexico's mercury production in the years of 1939 and 1940.

Administration
The municipal government of Saín Alto comprises a president, a councillor (Spanish: síndico), and thirteen trustees (regidores), eight elected by relative majority and five by proportional representation. The current president of the municipality is José Luis Salas Cordero.

Demographics
In the 2020 Mexican Census, the municipality of Saín Alto recorded a population of 21,844 inhabitants living in 5504 households. The 2010 Census recorded a population of 21,533 inhabitants in Saín Alto.

INEGI lists 53 localities in the municipality, of which only the municipal seat, also called Saín Alto, is classified as urban. It recorded a population of 5295 inhabitants in the 2020 Census.

Economy and infrastructure
The main crops grown in Saín Alto are corn and beans. Livestock ranching is another important agricultural activity, cattle, goats and horses being the commercially most important animals.

Federal Highway 45 runs through the municipality, connecting it to Sombrerete and Durango City in the west, and Fresnillo and Zacatecas City in the southeast. Federal Highway 49 defines the eastern border of the municipality.

References

Municipalities of Zacatecas
1825 establishments in Mexico
States and territories established in 1825